A series of bushfires in Australia occurred over the summer of 1996–1997. The most prominent fires during the season were in the Dandenong Ranges and the Mornington Peninsula in the state of Victoria.

Fires of note

Timeline

October 1996 
In October 1996, one house was destroyed in a bushfire near Ravensbourne in southeast Queensland.

January 1997 
From 19 to 21 January 1997, fires burnt over 400 hectares (about 990 acres) through much of the Dandenong Ranges and the Mornington Peninsula, precipitated by over forty-degree Celsius dry heat and strong northerly winds. Three people were killed and forty injured. Forty-three houses were destroyed and another 45 damaged. Fires began at all locations except the Dandenongs on the 19th; the Dandenongs fires began on the morning of the 21st in the foothills of the western face of the ranges. It was suspected that the fires in the Dandenongs were deliberately lit.

The areas most affected by these fires included:

Creswick
Dandenong Ranges
Ferny Creek – 3 deaths
Kalorama
Mount Dandenong
Upwey
Dutson Downs
Gippsland
Heathcote
Mornington Peninsula
Arthurs Seat
Mount Eliza
Mount Martha

References 

Overview of the fires & community response

1996
1996
Australian Bushfire Season, 1996-97
Australian Bushfire Season, 1996-97
Australian Bushfire Season, 1996-97
Australian Bushfire Season, 1996-97
1990s wildfires
1996 in Australia
1997 in Australia
Aust
Aust